Boky may refer to:
 Boky-boky or narrow-striped mongoose
 Colette Boky (born 1935), Canadian operatic soprano
 Gleb Boky (1879–1937), Soviet politician and Cheka officer

See also
 
 Bokyi (surname)